SamSam is a 2019 3D computer-animated superhero film directed by Tanguy de Kermel based on the children's television series of the same name created by Serge Bloch. Produced by Folivari, the film premiered at the Annecy International Animation Film Festival on 7 December 2019, and was released theatrically in France on 5 February 2020 by StudioCanal. It received generally negative reviews from critics, but it was a commercial success.

Plot 
SamSam lives a rich life with an array of friends, but the one thing he has yet to attain are actual superpowers. While he tries to figure it out, he must prepare to fight monsters and learn what it means to be a hero.

Voice cast 
Isaac Lobé-Lebel/Tucker Chandler as SamSam
Lior Chabbat/Lily Sanfelippo as Mega
Jérémy Prevost/Dino Andrade as King Marthial the 1st
Sébastien Desjours/Michael Yurchak as SamTeddy
Léopold vom Dorp/Connor Elias Andrade as SweetPea
Victoire Pauwels/Faith Graham as SuperJulie
Léovanie Raud/Michelle Deco as Lady Fathola
Laurent Maurel/Cam Clarke as Marthientist
Damien Boisseau/Evan Smith as SamDaddy
Marie-Eugénie Maréchal/Karen Strassman as SamMummy
Philippe Spiteri/Kellen Goff as MuckyYuck
Simon Brunner/Addie Chandler as Sumojo
Françoise Pavy/Karen Strassman as GrannyPea
Magali Rozensweig/Caitlin Prennace as Miss Bridget
Julien Crampon/Micheal Yurchak as Tuffy
Emmylou Homs/Caitlin Prennace as Catty
Martin Spinhayer/Kellen Goff as GloomyGlob Monster/The Wettabeds
Philippe Roullier as the television presenter

Release 
SamSam premiered at the Annecy International Animation Film Festival on 7 December 2019, and was released theatrically in France on 5 February 2020. It was distributed by StudioCanal. The film opened with $532,953 in France for a total gross of $2,315,818, and a worldwide total of $3,197,240. Outside of France, Poland had the largest number of admissions for SamSam with over 35,500, amounting to $171,672 at the Polish box office.

Reception 
The film received generally negative reviews from critics. On review aggregator Rotten Tomatoes, the film holds an approval rating of 20% based on 5 critical reviews.

References

External links 

Belgian animated films
2019 films
2010s French-language films
French-language Belgian films